The 1874 New Shoreham by-election was held on 13 March 1874.  The by-election was fought due to the incumbent Conservative MP, Stephen Cave, becoming Judge Advocate General, as it was common practice at the time to vacate a seat in being appointed to cabinet.  Cave retained his seat without a challenger.

References

1874 elections in the United Kingdom
1874 in England
19th century in Sussex
By-elections to the Parliament of the United Kingdom in Sussex constituencies
Shoreham-by-Sea
Unopposed ministerial by-elections to the Parliament of the United Kingdom in English constituencies
March 1874 events